Sweedeedee is a restaurant in Portland, Oregon.

The name of the restaurant refers to the song of the same name, which has been covered by Cat Power.

Description
Sweedeedee is located in north Portland, in the Humboldt neighborhood.

History
The restaurant opened in 2012.

Known primarily for brunch, the Sweedeedee began serving dinner in July 2021.

Reception
In 2021, The Oregonian Michael Russell gave the restaurant a 'B+' rating. He included Sweedeedee in the newspaper's "ultimate guide to Portland's 40 best brunches" in 2019. In 2020, Willamette Week readers named the restaurant a runner-up in the Best Brunch Spot category of the newspaper's annual readers' poll. Portland Monthly included the French toast in a 2022 list of "The 12 Best Breakfasts in Portland".

References

External links

 
 Sweedeedee at the Food Network
 Sweedeedee at Thrillist
 Sweedeedee at Zomato

2012 establishments in Oregon
Humboldt, Portland, Oregon
North Portland, Oregon
Restaurants established in 2012
Restaurants in Portland, Oregon